Zubovka is a rural locality (a village) in Muzyakovsky Selsoviet, Krasnokamsky District, Bashkortostan, Russia. The population was 28 as of 2010. There are 4 streets.

Geography 
Zubovka is located 18 km northeast of Nikolo-Beryozovka (the district's administrative centre) by road. Vorobyovo is the nearest rural locality.

References 

Rural localities in Krasnokamsky District